Bath County is a United States county on the central western border of the Commonwealth of Virginia, on the West Virginia state line. As of the 2020 census, the population was 4,209, the second-least populous county in Virginia. Bath's county seat is Warm Springs.

History and economy 
Bath County was created on December 14, 1790, from parts of Augusta, Botetourt, and Greenbrier counties. Due to the many mineral springs found in the area, the county was named for the English spa and resort city of Bath. In the early 1700s, before the county was formed, the area that subsequently became Bath County was settled by immigrants from England. The families who settled in what has since become Bath County came to Virginia from the English regions of Hampshire, Wiltshire, Gloucestershire, Northamptonshire, the western portion of Sussex, Dorset, Somerset, Norfolk, Suffolk, Surrey, Kent and Lincolnshire. This was notable because much of Shenandoah Valley region was settled by Scots-Irish immigrants and German farmers, both of whom were moving southward from Pennsylvania, whereas by contrast, what has since become Bath County was almost exclusively English. By the year 1800, Bath County was exclusively inhabited by first generation English immigrants and their Virginia-born children. This population was mostly subsistence farmers, though some were also artisans and smaller amounts were shopkeepers.

Like its namesake, Bath County's economy is focused on tourism and recreation. The county's major employer is The Omni Homestead, a resort and historic hotel built in 1766 as "The Homestead" in Hot Springs. Additional recreational opportunities are provided by camping and fishing at Lake Moomaw in the southern part of the county.

Ecology
Montane pine barrens are globally rare habitat, appearing as dwarfed shrublands, and only known in Virginia to occur on Warm Springs Mountain.

Geography

Located along the western central border with West Virginia, Bath County contains a number of villages, including Hot Springs, Warm Springs, Millboro and Mountain Grove. Hot Springs and Warm Springs are the most well known of the villages, given their natural mineral springs. Bath County is the only county in Virginia without a traffic signal.

Adjacent counties
 Highland County – north
 Augusta County – northeast
 Rockbridge County – east
 Alleghany County – south
 Greenbrier County, West Virginia – southwest
 Pocahontas County, West Virginia – west

National protected areas
 George Washington National Forest (part)
 United States National Radio Quiet Zone (part)

Major highways

Demographics

2020 census

Note: the US Census treats Hispanic/Latino as an ethnic category. This table excludes Latinos from the racial categories and assigns them to a separate category. Hispanics/Latinos can be of any race.

2000 Census
As of the census of 2000, there were 5,048 people, 2,053 households, and 1,451 families residing in the county.  The population density was 10 people per square mile (4/km2).  There were 2,896 housing units at an average density of 5 per square mile (2/km2).  The racial makeup of the county was 92.29% White, 6.28% Black or African American, 0.22% Native American, 0.38% Asian, 0.06% Pacific Islander, 0.10% from other races, and 0.67% from two or more races.  0.36% of the population were Hispanic or Latino of any race.

There were 2,053 households, out of which 28.00% had children under the age of 18 living with them, 58.60% were married couples living together, 7.80% had a female householder with no husband present, and 29.30% were non-families. 26.30% of all households were made up of individuals, and 12.10% had someone living alone who was 65 years of age or older.  The average household size was 2.34 and the average family size was 2.80.

In the county, the population was spread out, with 21.00% under the age of 18, 5.50% from 18 to 24, 28.20% from 25 to 44, 28.50% from 45 to 64, and 16.70% who were 65 years of age or older.  The median age was 42 years. For every 100 females there were 100.60 males.  For every 100 females age 18 and over, there were 99.20 males.

The median income for a household in the county was $35,013, and the median income for a family was $41,276. Males had a median income of $30,238 versus $21,974 for females. The per capita income for the county was $23,092.  7.80% of the population and 5.80% of families were below the poverty line.  Out of the total people living in poverty, 5.40% are under the age of 18 and 12.90% are 65 or older.

Government

Board of Supervisors
Cedar Creek district: Ron Shifflett (I)
Millboro district: Eddy T. Hicklin (I)
Valley Springs district: H. Lee Fry (I)
Warm Springs district:  Roy W. Burns (I)
Williamsville district: Thomas S. Burns (I)

Constitutional officers
Clerk of the Circuit Court: Annette T. Loan (I)
Commissioner of the Revenue: Angel M. Grimm (I)
Commonwealth's Attorney: John C. Singleton (I)
Sheriff: Robert W. Plecker (I)
Treasurer: Pam Webb (I)

Bath County is represented by Democrat Creigh Deeds in the Virginia Senate, Republican Ronnie R. Campbell in the Virginia House of Delegates, and Republican Ben Cline in the U.S. House of Representatives.

Politics

Economy
Tourism and recreation have been the focus of the economy from the time the county was established. The Omni Homestead, a luxury mountain resort in Hot Springs, is the county's major employer.

The resort grew around the area's mineral springs, such as the Jefferson Pools. (As of July 1, 2018, the Jefferson Pools have been closed by the resort. The pools are anticipated to reopen once the safety of their surrounding structures is verified.)

Bath County is also home to the Bath County Pumped Storage Station, a pumped storage hydroelectric power plant.

Education
The county has two elementary schools (serving students from pre-kindergarten to seventh grade) and one high school (serving students in grades 8 through 12). Around 555 students are enrolled in the school system.

Media
The Recorder is the newspaper of record serving Bath, Highland, and the Allegheny Highlands region of Virginia. Newspaper offices are located in Monterey (Highland County) and Mitchelltown (Bath County).

Communities

Census-designated places
 Hot Springs
 Warm Springs

Other unincorporated communities

 Armstrong
 Ashwood
 Bacova
 Bacova Junction
 Bolar
 Burnsville
 Carloover
 Chimney Run
 Crowdertown
 Fort Lewis
 Green Valley
 Healing Springs
 McClung
 Millboro
 Millboro Springs
 Mitchelltown
 Mountain Grove
 Sunrise
 Switch Back
 Thomastown
 Tinkertown
 West Warm Springs
 Williamsville
 Yost

Notable people
 Creigh Deeds, Virginia Senator (25th District)
 Jailyn Ford, NPF pitcher
 Dan Ingalls, computer scientist, president of the Homestead
 John Phillips, NFL tight end 
 Sam Snead, professional golfer

See also
 National Register of Historic Places listings in Bath County, Virginia

References

External links
 
 Bath County Travel Guide

 
Virginia counties
1790 establishments in Virginia
Counties of Appalachia
Populated places established in 1790